The University of Nebraska State Museum, also known as Morrill Hall, founded in 1871, is a natural history museum featuring Nebraska biodiversity, paleontology, and cultural diversity, located on the University of Nebraska–Lincoln City Campus near the corner of 14th and Vine Streets in Lincoln, Nebraska, United States.
The museum houses Mueller Planetarium, a hands-on science discovery center, and the Elephant Hall, where visitors can see the world's largest articulated fossil mammoth among the collection of fossil elephants.  Also featured are interactive paleontology exhibits, a dinosaur gallery, ancient life and evolution exhibits, wildlife dioramas, gems and minerals, American Indian and African exhibits, and a temporary exhibit gallery featuring rotating displays on diverse topics including photography, quilts and fine arts.

History 

The University of Nebraska State Museum was founded in 1871 by Erwin Barbour, the same year the University of Nebraska was established. The museums first home was two rooms located in Nebraska Hall. The first collections were recorded to be skeletons of a horse and a cow. In 1891, Erwin Barbour went on an expedition in search of fossils and minerals to contribute to the museum's empty cases. Barbour discovered a new fossil, Daimonelix. His contribution caught the attention of Charles Morrill in 1892. When Morrill learned Barbour's trip was not funded by the university, he donated $1,000 for the next expedition to keep the collections growing. Morrill continued to donate money to the museum throughout his life, which in turn allowed Barbour to send out over one hundred expeditions. Morrill Hall, the museums location since 1927, was dedicated to Charles Morrill for his contributions.

The museum has three floors filled with exhibits. The first floor has a theme of Biodiversity and includes The Hall of Nebraska Wildlife, Darwin: A Life of Discovery, Dr Paul and Betty Marx Science Discovery Center, and an Educators Resource Center. The first floor has exhibits about Paleontology of Nebraska. Elephant Hall, Ralph Muller Planetarium, Bizarre Beasts, Toren Gallery of Ancient Life, Mesozoic Gallery, Fossil Animals, and a Discovery Shop are found on this floor. The third floor of the museum houses a variety of exhibits including Explore Evolution, Jurassic Dinosaurs, Rocks and Minerals, Weapons Throughout time, and First People of the Plains. Cooper Gallery, which displays temporary exhibits, is also found on the third floor.

Buildings 
The University of Nebraska State Museum was first located in University Hall. Nebraska Hall was built in 1888 to make room for growing exhibits and enrollment in the university. In 1905, Charles Morrill wrote a letter expressing concerns with Nebraska Hall's structure and limited space. His proposal for a new building was granted. It was complete in 1908. The new building caught fire on March 6, 1912, causing major damage to the building and contents of the museum. The building was restored and served as the museum until 1927 when Morrill Hall was built. Morrill Hall was constructed based on the information gathered by Charles Morrill and Erwin Barbour's tour of museums in Europe in 1909. On May 28, 1927, Morrill Hall was dedicated to Charles Morrill for his contributions to the Museum.

Exhibits

Paleontology of Nebraska 

Located on the main floor of the museum, the Paleontology of Nebraska exhibits include the Elephant Hall, Mesozoic Gallery, Fossil Animals, Toren Gallery of Ancient Life. These exhibits display various fossil collections. The museum is known for its vast vertebrate paleontology collection, ranking fifth in the nation. The museum has been gathering its paleontology collections since 1891, when the Director Erwin Barbour began to excavate fossils from Western Nebraska. So far, more than 85,000 vertebrate species have been cataloged. Most of the collections originate from Nebraska. The collections from the Plaeistocene and Cretaceous are from New Mexico and Montana, respectively.

The Elephant Hall is famous for having one of the largest mammoth skeletons in the world. Among them, the museum hosts the largest Columbian mammoth fossil in the world, known as "Archie." It is also the state fossil of Nebraska.  Along with the mammoth skeletons, the Hall displays skeletons and models of elephants of various eras. By comparing the structure of the skeletons and the elephants' teeth, visitors can learn about the evolutionary history of the elephants.

The Mesozoic Gallery features skeletons and models of organisms that lived during the Mesozoic era. Along with the fossils of the dinosaurs, the Gallery is famous for its Plesiosaur fossil that was excavated in 2004 from Northeast Nebraska, which is known to be one of the longest marine fossil.  The Toren Gallery of Ancient Life includes models of organisms of the Paleozoic era.

The Fossil Animals section displays ancient and current skeletons of rhinos, horses, and camels. Recent donations to the museum are also shown in this area.

Tree of Life 
Officially opened on February 22, 2013, the Tree of Life exhibit is a relatively recent addition to the museum. It was developed in partnership with Harvard University, Northwestern University, The University of Michigan, and the University of Nebraska–Lincoln.  This exhibit combines interactive touchscreen technology with a vast phylogenetic database to provide a fun educational experience for users of all ages. Museum visitors can browse an evolutionary tree showing the evolutionary relationships of more than 70,000 species over 3.5 billion years. It is often difficult to spur an interest in evolutionary concepts, especially in a museum. Since visitors can browse exhibits rather quickly, the Tree of Life exhibit is designed to hold the attention of users. Once a user is actively using the interactive technology, they are more likely to spend enough time to gain a substantial understanding of core ideas in evolutionary science. The University of Nebraska State Museum has incorporated the Tree of Life exhibit into some undergraduate biology courses.

Weapons Throughout Time 
Weapons Throughout Time showcases a large collection of artifacts collected over the years. Officially opened in October 2009, it is one of the older exhibits in the museum.  As the name suggests, the bulk of items in the collection were used as tools of survival and combat. Some pieces in the collection include stone arrowheads used by Native Americans in the Great Plains, Amazonian blow darts, Zulu hunting spears, Japanese and Samoan armor, and firearms from Asia, the Middle East, and the Western hemisphere. These artifacts give visitors insight into the culture of the people that created them, and the cultural differences are evident in the artistic design. Some items are over 9,000 years old.

Explore Evolution 
The Explore Evolution exhibit was opened in September 2005. It was designed to educate the public about important evolutionary concepts using the work of several evolutionary scientists. The scientists whose work is included within the exhibit are: Charles Wood, Sherily Fritz and Edward Theriot, Cameron Currie, Kenneth Kaneshiro, Rosemary and Peter Grant, Svante Paabo and Henrik Kaessmann, and Philip Gingerich.  This exhibit simplifies and reinforces the work of the scientists mentioned above using videos, models, and interactive components. Although it is designed to stimulate curiosity in young museum visitors, the Explore Evolution exhibit contains vast stores of information that will keep even the most educated evolutionary scientist interested.

Hall of Nebraska Wildlife 
The Hall of Nebraska Wildlife exhibit offers a collection of wildlife dioramas that allow visitors to appreciate animals, birds, and plants from different Nebraskan regions. One component of this exhibit includes an installed modern Bison bison, a presumed descendant of the Nebraskan Ice Age Bison antiquus, an extinct species since 4,000–5,000 years ago. Additionally, in February 2008, the Nebraskan State Museum installed its first mountain lion provided by the Nebraska Game and Parks Commission after it was struck and killed by traffic on Interstate 80. Chemical analysis of the mountain lion's claws suggests it had travelled from the Black Hills of South Dakota along the Missouri or Elkhorn Rivers. The exhibit also displays African animals that fall on the Red List of Threatened Animals, a compiled list of all threatened animals. A few shown animals include the Kobus ellipsiprymnus (Swimming Waterbuck), a medium-sized antelope that is at a "lower risk," and the Diceros bicornis (Black Rhinoceros) who are now "critically endangered" due to overhunting.

Mueller Planetarium 
Mueller Planetarium was a gift to the university from Ralph S. Mueller, a Cleveland industrialist and inventor of the alligator clip. The planetarium was completed and dedicated in 1958, becoming the first planetarium in Nebraska. More than 20,000 people attended shows at the planetarium during its first six months of operation.

Jack Dunn hosted the planetarium's first laser light show featuring electronic music using a car speaker surround system and two slide projectors in 1977.  Visually impaired audiences brought to attention that it was difficult to see the stars projected during laser shows, and the Mueller Planetarium began working to improve the quality of the show. The "laser star show" developed specifically for the visually impaired became an official project of the International Laser Display Association (ILDA) in 1993, and the program was shared internationally with laser display companies. Through working with Hayden by ILDA of California, the show was optimized using a high-contrast dots and lines display to aid the visually impaired. Mueller Planetarium received a First Place Award for Outstanding Laser Display in November 1993.
In 2006, Dunn intensified the light show by installing a full-dome system using spherical mirrors that project shows across the 30-foot-wide dome. As of 2016, the Mueller Planetarium still offers laser light shows along with informational shows depicting the solar system and Nebraskan night skies.

Community involvement 
The University of Nebraska State Museum offers educational community events that allow a closer view of natural processes. The Planetarium offers informational shows that are geared towards younger ages, introducing children to the solar system, and shows that contain complex information understood more easily by adults. In addition, the University of Nebraska State Museum offers rotating hands-on activities for a range of younger ages. During the month of December 2016, an interactive "Augmented Reality Watershed Table" aims to promote freshwater ecosystem understanding and stewardship by allowing visitors to create topography models by shaping sand that is graphically projected from overhead and interacting with the "ecosystem" by stimulating water and rainfall. Also during December 2016, the University of Nebraska State Museum will hold "Sunday with a Junior Scientist," where middle schoolers from Lincoln are able to present their science projects to museum visitors.

The University of Nebraska State Museum is also involved in research pertaining to anthropology, botany, entomology, vertebrate and invertebrate paleontology, zoology, and parasitology. From 2007 to 2015, the State Museum partnered with biomedical researchers, artists, educators, writers, and youth to create a public campaign aimed at expanding diverse audiences' knowledge about microbes and infectious disease. Artists created comic strips that proved to be more student-interactive than standard textbooks, and through the Omaha Science Media Project, students and teachers were offered a two-week immersion experience at virology research labs at the Nebraska Center for Virology and the University of Nebraska Medical Center. Here, teachers and students researched viruses and were able to broadcast their laboratory experiences through collaboration with Nebraska Public Television, University of Nebraska School of Journalism, and Soundprint Media, Inc.

Leadership 
Directors:
 1874–1885 Samuel Aughey
 1885–1891 Lewis E. Hicks
 1891–1941 E.H. Barbour 
 1941–1973 C.B. Shultz
 1974–1982 James H. Gunnerson
 1982–1984 Allen Griesemer and John Janovy (through 1996) as Intern Directors
 1986–1994 Hugh Genoways
 1995–2003 James Estes
 2003–2015 Priscilla Grew 
 2015–present Susan J. Weller 
Samuel Aughey was the first director of the museum in 1871. He helped maintain the university's standing in 1875 when it was in danger of closing.

Susan J. Weller is the current director for the Nebraska State Natural History Museum. She was a director for the J.F. Bell Museum of Natural History from 2008 to 2015.

Contributors 
 1871: Stephen F. Nuckolls contributes mineral artifacts to the Nebraska State Museum.
 1893–1941: Charles H. Morrill provides funding for research purposes, geological specimen, and fossil artifacts.
 1988: The Nebraska State Museum receives a grant for $3.7 million from the Nebraska State Legislature.
 1989–1992: The National Science Foundation awards approximately $380,000 for renovation purposes to include endangered species collection.
 2008: Entomology sector receives funding (around $480,000) from the National Science Foundation for beetle research.
 2007–2012: National Institutes of Health awards grant to create World of Viruses exhibit within the University of Nebraska State Museum.
 2013: Claire M. Hubbard Foundation allocates $150,000 to the museum for educational endeavors, technology advancements, and youth programs.

Gallery

References

External links 

 University of Nebraska State Museum

Museums in Lincoln, Nebraska
University of Nebraska–Lincoln
Natural history museums in Nebraska
University museums in Nebraska
1871 establishments in Nebraska
Museums established in 1871
Paleontology in Nebraska
Dioramas